Hradečno is a municipality and village in Kladno District in the Central Bohemian Region of the Czech Republic. It has about 500 inhabitants.

Administrative parts
Villages of Nová Studnice and Nová Ves are administrative parts of Hradečno.

References

Villages in Kladno District